ArmComedy is an Armenian comedy show first aired in March 2012. It is aired thrice a week on ATV channel. Originally started as a satirical news website, it later evolved into a web series on the CivilNet Internet TV channel. After two years,  the creators of the show were invited to expand to network television.  ArmComedy became the "first satiric news show in Armenia dripped in political humor and wit, reporting the real news with a different perspective". Every episode of ArmComedy is written and hosted by Armenian comedians Narek Margaryan and Sergey Sargsyan. It has been dubbed in press as "Armenia's version of The Daily Show".

In October 2015, Conan O'Brien was guest on ArmComedy during his trip to Armenia. He planned to invite the hosts on his show if they ever visited America. In May 2017, Narek Margaryan and Sergey Sargsyan were on US standup tour  and were invited as guests on Conan. During their tour Sergey and Narek were awarded the keys to the city of Glendale, California.

In 2021 the show announced  that they are leaving television and will return to YouTube where it originally started.

Notable guests
Conan O'Brien, American comedian
Serzh Sargsyan, former President of Armenia (2008-2018)
Garik Martirosyan, Comedian, TV host, actor 
Ken Davitian, American actor
Armen Ashotyan, former Minister of Education and Science of Armenia
Batman, fictional
Nikol Pashinyan, politician, current Prime Minister of Armenia
Paruyr Hayrikyan, politician
Raffi Hovannisian, politician
Levon Oganezov, Russian filmmaker of Armenian origin
Gor Sujyan, singer
Arto Tunçboyacıyan, singer
Mkrtich Arzumanyan, actor
Aram MP3, singer
Nazeni Hovhannisyan, actress
Iveta Mukuchyan, singer-songwriter

References

External links
Official Website
IMDb

Armenian comedy television series
Armenian-language television shows
2012 Armenian television series debuts
2010s Armenian television series
ATV (Armenia) original programming